Pyrilutamide (developmental code name KX-826) is a nonsteroidal antiandrogen (NSAA) – specifically, a selective high-affinity silent antagonist of the androgen receptor (AR) – which is under development by Suzhou Kintor Pharmaceuticals, inc., a subsidiary of Kintor Pharmaceutical Limited, for the potential treatment of androgenic alopecia (androgen-dependent scalp hair loss) and acne in China and the United States. As of October 2022, it is in phase 3 clinical trials for androgenic alopecia and phase 2 trials for acne.

Development
Pyrilutamide successfully completed phase II clinical trials in China and is currently in phase II clinical trials in the U.S for the potential treatment of androgenetic alopecia in males. It is currently in phase II clinical trials in China for the potential treatment of androgenetic alopecia in females. The drug is about to enter phase III clinical trials in China which will be conducted over 24 weeks across more than 20 sites in China with a sample size of 416. 

The primary endpoint is the change from baseline in non-vellus target area hair count (TAHC) at the end of week 24. The drug will be dosed at 10mg (0.5% BID) per patient per day in the trial which is expected to start in Q1 2022.

Adverse effects
Pyrilutamide is generally well-tolerated. The most common adverse event is contact dermatitis.

Pharmacology

Pharmacodynamics
Pyrilutamide binds to the androgen receptor with a very high affinity with an IC50 of 0.28nM.  Reference drug Bicalutamide had an IC50 of 3.1nM.

Pharmacokinetics
In Phase I clinical trials, Pyrilutamide and metabolite KX-982's systemic absorption was evaluated across different doses of 0.5, 2, 6, 12, and 24 mg/body/day.

References

Dermatologic drugs
Experimental drugs
Fluoroarenes
Hair loss medications
Imidazolidines
Nitriles
Nonsteroidal antiandrogens
Oxazoles
Peripherally selective drugs
Trifluoromethyl compounds